As a selling technique, a sales presentation or sales pitch is a line of talk that attempts to persuade someone or something, with a planned sales presentation strategy of a product or service designed to initiate and close a sale of the product or service.

A sales pitch is essentially designed to be either an introduction of a product or service to an audience who knows nothing about it, or a descriptive expansion of a product or service that an audience has already expressed interest in. Sales professionals prepare and give a sales pitch, which can be either formal or informal, and might be delivered in any number of ways. A sales pitch may be invited by an organisation looking to obtain supplies or services, for example in a commissioning context.

Elements

First impression 

The first visual and audible impression upon a market or client can appeal any of the five senses in order to initiate excellent chemistry between the buyer and seller.

A way of luring in the potential candidate to ensure the overall advertisement is emphasized. Not necessarily an exchange of currency must be made but an official deal of trade or contract is desired from the pitching party. With a wide variety of selling techniques used to "pitch", it is possible to apply one or a combination in a single attempt.

Inspired by what has worked in the past from successful contributors to the art of the pitch, at least a slight modification is always required in order for it to be an authentic and most of all an effective pitch, otherwise the tone would not fit the sellers outfit and in critical situations be spotted as a fake by the candidate and in such a case defying the purpose.

For a strikingly good pitch, one must know exactly what the other party wants and doesn't want and be informed of as much information as possible about the candidate being pitched to. Focus on a virtual balance of the candidate's needs and wants to maximize one's leverage when in the process of a pitch. Overall meaning: one gets only one chance to make a good first impression. At least two senses must connect: vision, and hearing. But the more one can connect at a single point of impact, the better.

Beginning statement
Usually the first sentence of a sales pitch is supposed to be either an attention-grabbing statement or a positive statement introducing the best information about the provider of goods or service. A method is  usually selected depending on available attention span from the prospective client.

There are certain groups with a lower attention span (for example children) for whom a sales pitch must capture their attention within the first few seconds to be effective. Frequently used methods for this are beginning a talk with a surprising or even shocking statement which the targets then stay to see the conclusion of.

Normally people with children, shopkeepers, and people in a hurry are not able to give much attention especially if the explanation is not immediately intriguing or it is in broken English. Sellers of low-value, fast-moving consumer goods (FMCG) are usually known to deploy the first method.

In the second strategy, 'positive statement begins' is adopted in solution selling  usually in direct selling to corporate and or high value and or capital goods selling. Here, the purpose of the positive statement is to emphasize a particular positive aspect of a provider to brand it according to seller's  situational need.

Issues
In 2021-22, advertisers and agencies raised concerns about the excessive volume of work and associated pressures entailed in making sales pitches for advertising opportunities. Criticisms raised argued that pitches were being requested unnecessarily often and their production being made too complex and too costly. The Pitch Positive Pledge was adopted as a result, according to which industry players would ensure a pitch was actually required before proceeding, "run a positive pledge" and "provide a positive resolution". Feedback to unsuccessful bidders is a key element of this process.

See also

References

Further reading
 Malcolm Bird, The Complete Guide to Business and Sales Presentation. Springer, 1990.
 Thomas D. Fallon, What a Salesman Should Know. Planning and Making Your Sales Presentation. Chicago: Dartnell Corporation, 1965.
 Linda Richardson, Winning Group Sales Presentations: A Guide to Closing the Deal. New York: McGraw-Hill, 1991.
 Charles Roth, Successful Sales Presentations: How to Build Them-How to Use Them. Englewood Cliffs, NJ: Prentice-Hall, 1955.
 David Sellars, Developing and Role Playing Effective Sales Presentations: A "How-To", Step-by-Step Guide for In-Seat and Online Courses and Corporate Training Programs. Mason, OH: Thomson South-Western, 2004.
 Stephen Schiffman, Power Sales Presentations: Complete Sales Dialogues for Each Critical Step of the Sales Cycle Qualifying, Interviewing, Presentation, Closing. Adams Media Corporation, 1989.
 Robert L. Shook, The Perfect Sales Presentation. New York: Bantam Books, 1990.
 Terry L. Sjodin, New Sales Speak: The 9 Biggest Sales Presentation Mistakes and How To Avoid Them. New York: Wiley, 2006.
 Oren Klaff, Pitch anything: An innovative method for presenting, persuading, and winning the deal. New York: McGraw-Hill, 2011. .

Selling techniques